Vemod is the title of the first studio album released by the Swedish art rock band Anekdoten. According to the Trivia page of the Anektdoten website, the word "vemod" means in Swedish "(...)[tender] sadness / [pensive] melancholy."

Track listing
 "Karelia" – 7:20
 "The Old Man & the Sea" – 7:50
 "Where Solitude Remains" – 7:20
 "Thoughts in Absence" – 4:10
 "The Flow" – 6:58
 "Longing" – 4:50
 "Wheel" – 7:52
 "Sad Rain" – 10:14 (Japanese bonus track)

Personnel
Nicklas Berg (changed name to Nicklas Barker after marriage) - guitar, Mellotron
Anna Sofi Dahlberg - cello, Mellotron, vocals
Jan Erik Liljeström - bass guitar, vocals
Peter Nordins - percussives
with:
Per Wiberg - piano
Pär Ekström - flugelhorn, cornet

Credits
Recorded in Studio Largen, March–April 1993.
Engineered by Roger Skogh and Simon Nordberg.
Produced by Anekdoten, Roger Skogh and Simon Nordberg.
Photography by Thomas Södergren and Natalie Dumanska.
Layout and design by Teolinda.

Release history
Sept. 1993: Virtalevy, Virta 001, Sweden CD
Jan. 1994: Colours, COSLP017, Norway LP - 1,000 copies pressed, first 250 included a color poster
Feb. 1995: Prog Rock Music, PRM 015, Poland cassette
Aug. 1995: Arcángelo, ARC-1001, Japan CD - first pressing (1,500 copies) was housed in a vinyl coating gatefold sleeve
Aug. 1996: Record Heaven, RHPD2, Sweden picture disc LP
July 1999: Rock Symphony, RSLN 012, Brazil CD

References
The Official Anekdoten page

Anekdoten albums
1993 debut albums